Alfredo Manuel Ávila Vergara (born June 17, 1991), known as Alfredo Ávila, is a professional squash player who has represented Mexico. He reached a career-high world ranking of World No. 35 in January 2016.

In 1998 at his young age (7 years old he discovered his great sports talent within the squash, ten years later he became professional starting his walk through the PSA, since the beginning of his career, the player is positioned within the first three national places. He has been under the guidance of coaches Rubén Alfredo Avila Miyazawa and Ulises Márquez.
His best professional world ranking was in January 2016, positioning himself as # 35 of the PSA players. It has 11 Professional Titles and 15 professional endings. Its current sponsor is Head.
At youth level in 2009 and 2010 he reached the semifinals twice in the "British Junior Open" tournament something that no Mexican player has achieved in the history of this sport.
Alfredo is the only Mexican player who has won a $50,000 DLL Professional tournament (Colombia 2015), being a tournament in which world top 10 players participated, this earned him the appointment of player of the month in September 2015 by the PSA (Professional Squash Association) and by the English magazine Magazine Squash, something that no Mexican has obtained.

References

External links 
 
 
 

1991 births
Living people
Mexican male squash players
Pan American Games medalists in squash
Pan American Games bronze medalists for Mexico
Squash players at the 2019 Pan American Games
Medalists at the 2019 Pan American Games